The World's Strongest Man is an international Strongman competition held every year. Organized by American event management company IMG, a subsidiary of Endeavor, it is broadcast in the US during summers and in the UK around the end of December each year. Competitors qualify based on placing in the top three at the four to eight Giants Live events each year.

The current event sponsor is SBD Apparel. Previous sponsors include Tachi Palace, Coregenx, Commerce Hotel and Casino, DAF Trucks, Tonka, MET-Rx, and PartyPoker.com.

The event has a number of rival and parallel competitions with which it is sometimes confused, including the Strongman Super Series, the now defunct IFSA Strongman World Championships (run from 2005 to 2007 after the International Federation of Strength Athletes parted company with WSM in 2004) and Strongman Champions League.

History 
There are now several documentaries available that chart the history of WSM. The first major one is Worlds Strongest Man - Thirty Years Of Pain from 2008, celebrating the 30th anniversary. In 2017, a series of videos were released in recognition of the 40th anniversary of the contest.

1970s–1980s
The concept behind "The World's Strongest Men", as it was originally named, was developed in 1977 for CBS by Langstar Inc. David Webster, a Scot who later received an OBE for his services to sport, was the head coordinator of the competition from its inception. Dr. Douglas Edmunds, seven-time Scottish shot and discus champion and twice world caber champion, worked with Webster and when Webster retired, Edmunds took over. These two men were responsible for inviting the competitors and choosing the events. In the meantime, in 1982, CBS sold the rights to the BBC, who in turn sold the rights to TWI. In 1987, the WSM was not held for the only time since its inception. In that year, the first and only non-team Pure Strength competition was held, but it was not part of the WSM franchise.

For the first several contests, well-known American color commentators and analysts were used on the network broadcast. These included Brent Musburger, Tom Brookshier, and acknowledged strength authority, journalist and author Dr. Terry Todd. Todd was a former powerlifting world record holder himself and went on to establish the H.J. Lutcher Stark Center for Physical Culture and Sports in 1990. He also was asked to establish the Arnold Strongman Classic in 2001 by Arnold Schwarzenegger.

During this early period, the contest ranks consisted mostly of American football players, powerlifters, and bodybuilders and were held in American locations until it was moved to Christchurch, New Zealand, in 1983. Two-time winner Bruce Wilhelm (USA) retired and was succeeded by the massive Don Reinhoudt in 1979, a 162 kg (357 lb) heavyweight powerlifter of the US. Reinhoudt still holds several unequipped world records in powerlifting to this day.

In 1979, newcomer and legendary powerlifter Bill Kazmaier (USA) made his appearance, coming in 3rd after leading much of the competition. He dominated the sport to such an extent from 1980 to 1982, winning by a record 28 points in 1980. He reportedly was excluded from the competition for five years, after becoming the first man to win three consecutive WSM titles. He set prodigious marks with a 478.5 kg (1055 lb) silver dollar coin deadlift, 439.5 kg (969 lb) squat (smith machine), and a then-record 165.6 kg (365 lb) log lift with a rough, unbalanced log. This eventually earned him a place in the WSM Hall of Fame.

After Kazmaier left, his nearest rival, former Olympian Geoff Capes from the UK, traded wins with the Icelandic powerlifter Jón Páll Sigmarsson, with Capes winning in 1983 and 1985, and Sigmarsson in 1984 and 1986. Sigmarsson raised the popularity and awareness of the event to new levels. He died three years after winning his 4th and final WSM in 1990. In 1987, Sigmarsson would defeat Capes and Kazmaier in Pure Strength. Kazmaier returned to WSM in 1988, but could not dethrone Sigmarsson, who won his 3rd title. The only other man to claim the title in this era was Jamie Reeves, which he did in 1989. Reeves was injured in 1990, as Sigmarsson narrowly claimed his 4th title ahead of O.D. Wilson, who was leading by 5.5 points going into the final event, a controversial 200m race with 100 kg on the back. Sigmarsson won the event, and the much larger Wilson finished way down the field, meaning Jon Pall became the first man to claim four titles.

1990s–2000s
In 1995, Edmunds and Webster, along with representatives from the competitors including Jamie Reeves, Ilkka Kinnunen and Marcel Mostert formed a governing body called the International Federation of Strength Athletes ("IFSA"). The IFSA began organizing bespoke events, such as the IFSA European Championships and also took the lead in working with the BBC and with TWI to organize the World's Strongest Man competition. For almost a decade, the IFSA and WSM were inextricably mixed, but this changed in 2004. The InvestGroup Ventures' sports rights management arm, InvestGroup Sports Management, invested heavily into IFSA and this led to the creation of IFSA Strongman. The strategy was to acquire most of the international assets and properties relating to the strongman sport. In essence, this was a new organisation with some, such as Magnus Samuelsson, describing it as "a new company ... with the same name as our old federation". The attempt at dominance was not well received by TWI and disagreement ensued leading to a split in the sport. Previously, in 2001, the IFSA in its former guise had entered an agreement with World Class Events (WCE), headed by Ulf Bengtsson, to run the Super Series. This Super Series was designed to award the World Championship title, but also acted as a qualifying vehicle for the WSM. When strongman split in 2004, the Super Series sided with TWI forming a rival federation to the IFSA. With the WSM being a TWI owned event, IFSA Holdings announced its own World Championships for 2005, to be held in Quebec, and thus from that point had no involvement in the WSM contest.

The split with IFSA, which banned its registered athletes from competing at WSM, meant that not all the recognized best strength athletes in the world were eligible to compete. However, the reputation of WSM as the premier event maintained its lure for broadcasting purposes. In recent years, the competition has been broadcast on ESPN, ESPN2, TSN, Televisa Deportes and Five, and currently CBS Sports Network in the US. The longevity of the contest in strength athletics and its high levels of TV exposure over the years has led to it being described as "the granddaddy of all strongman contests".

In recent years, to curb injuries, the contest events have included a certain amount of athleticism rather than being about raw strength. This has led some critics to say that contests such as the Arnold Strongman Classic or Fortissimus are the true strongest man competitions. However, it is routinely described as "the Worlds" by top strongman competitors and despite the critics, it is the leading brand name in the field. No other strongman contest commands close to the WSM's levels of TV exposure. The World's Strongest Man claims a viewership of 220 million.

In the early 1990s, Magnús Ver Magnússon (Iceland) won the title four times (1991, 1994–1996) and became the second and only man along with the legendary Bill Kazmaier to win three consecutive titles. He came into the 1991 contest as the reserve and ended up winning the show, and is the only man to do so.

Magnús would also finish 2nd in both 1992 and 1993. The 1992 contest was won by Dutchman Ted van der Parre, who at 7 feet tall, is the tallest man ever to win or compete at the World's Strongest Man. In one of the closest contests in the competition's history, just 1 point separated Ted in 1st from Magnús and Jamie Reeves, who tied for 2nd. Conversely, in 1993, Welshman Gary Taylor became the shortest man to ever win the contest at just 6 feet tall, defeating Magnús and Riku Kiri of Finland.

Magnús would finally get his second title in 1994, defeating Austrian Manfred Hoeberl in the closely fought contest, with Kiri finishing 3rd for the second year running. He retained his title the following year, with South African Gerrit Badenhorst and Finland's Marko Varalahti completing the podium. In 1996, Magnús made it to three titles in a row, with his closest competitor Kiri pulling out of the final event due to injury, but still finishing in second. Badenhorst made the podium for the second year in a row. Remarkably, none of these three men would make the final the following year.

The late 1990s saw Scandinavian countries taking control of the title, and this lasted until 2002. The relatively small 125 kg (275 lb) but dynamic Jouko Ahola from Finland won two titles in three years during this period. He later became a referee in WSM/strongman events and an actor. Sweden's Magnus Samuelsson would claim the 1998 title, becoming the only man to defeat Ahola in a WSM contest. Following Ahola's retirement, fellow Finn Janne Virtanen would improve on his 1999 runner up finish and take the title for himself in 2000. The final Scandinavian in this group to take the title was Norwegian Svend Karlsen, who did so in 2001.

The early to late 2000s were dominated by five-time Polish winner Mariusz Pudzianowski, earning the nickname: "The Dominator". Looking muscular and defined, he temporarily redefined what a strongman was in the world's eyes. At about 142 kg (313 lb) at max weight, he routinely beat men much bigger than he was. He combined speed and massive strength in one package. Indeed, he was so dominant, that three of his five championships (2003, 2005 and 2007) were won with an event to spare. His final win was in 2008 as bigger and taller men came into the sport.

Pudzianowski's first title was in 2002, as the era of Scandinavian dominance came to end, with Lithuanian Žydrūnas Savickas and Latvian Raimonds Bergmanis completing the podium. He would defend his title in 2003 in spectacular fashion. He won 4 of the 7 events, and claiming two 2nd places and a 3rd place in the remaining events to finish with 66 out of a possible 70 points, and 20 ahead of runner up Savickas. 2003 was also the first appearance of Ukrainian Vasyl Virastyuk, who finished 3rd.

In 2004, Savickas and Virastyuk were tied for the lead heading into the final event, the Atlas Stones. Virastyuk would defeat Savickas to claim the title, with the Lithuanian finishing as runner up for the 3rd year in a row. Originally, Mariusz Pudzianowski finished in 3rd but was later disqualified after failing a drugs test, meaning Magnus Samuelsson would once again finish on the podium.

Following the split of IFSA and WSM, most of the athletes would stick with IFSA. Pudzianowski was, in fact, the only athlete from the 2004 contest to compete at WSM in 2005. He would win the contest with an event to spare ahead of runner up Jesse Marunde, who with 3rd place Dominic Filiou became the first non-Europeans to reach the podium of WSM since O.D. Wilson in 1990.

The 2006 competition ended in dramatic fashion: in the final, Mariusz Pudzianowski started well by coming tied-1st in the Deadlift and winning the Power Stairs easily; but by then winning the last 5 events in a row, Phil Pfister edged out the Pole in the final event, the Atlas stones. Pfister became the first American to win the competition since 1982, and the first American ever to win the competition outside the United States.

Pudzianowski regained his crown in 2007, winning the contest with an event to spare. Fellow Pole Sebastian Wenta claimed 2nd place, with Britain's Terry Hollands rounding out the podium.

In 2008, Derek Poundstone had a large lead over Mariusz Pudzianowski after 3 events but Pudzianowski tied the Deadlift event for first place and then won the crucial Plane Pull to narrow the gap. Pudzianowski and Poundstone then battled for the title of World's Strongest Man in the last event, the Atlas Stones. Pudzianowski blistered through the event and was able to keep pace with the heavier Poundstone. On the final stone, Pudzianowski was able to capitalize on Poundstone's drop and clinched his fifth title.

In 2009, the long-running IFSA/WSM split had ended resulting in finally having all of the top strongmen from around the world all in the same contest. Two-time IFSA World Champion Žydrūnas Savickas would return to the contest after 5 years, and claimed his first WSM title, with defending champion Mariusz coming in second in his final ever WSM contest. Another up and comer Brian Shaw placed third.

2010s
Žydrūnas Savickas repeated his victory in 2010, winning by countback against Brian Shaw in the closest finish in WSM history. Top IFSA competitor and fan favorite Mikhail Koklyaev finished third in his WSM debut.

In 2011, Brian Shaw and two-time defending champion Žydrūnas Savickas were tied on points going into the final event. Shaw defeated Savickas in the Atlas Stones, winning his first title. Over the next four years, the pair would trade the title back and forth.
Going into the 2012 contest, Shaw suffered from nerve damage in his hands and slipped down to fourth place. This opened the door for Savickas to capture his third WSM title, with fellow Lithuanian Vytautas Lalas coming in second and the Icelandic giant Hafþór Júlíus Björnsson finishing third.
Shaw would regain his title in 2013, ahead of Savickas (2nd) and Björnsson (3rd). The 2014 contest was one of the closest battles in WSM history, with these three men separated by just two points going into the Atlas Stones. Savickas clinched the title by just half a point ahead of Björnsson, and just 3 ahead of Shaw, becoming the fourth man to win four titles. This victory made Savickas the oldest athlete to ever win the title at the age of 38 years and 8 months.

Shaw would defeat Savickas once again in 2015, with the title coming down to the two of them in the final event for the 4th time. Björnsson finished on the podium yet again, with Britain's Eddie Hall coming in 4th. Savickas didn't compete in 2016, as Shaw successfully defended his title and joined Savickas on four titles. Björnsson made a 5th podium finish as the runner up, as Hall continued his steady rise to finish 3rd, despite placing last in the first event.

In the 2017 contest, two four-time winners (Brian Shaw and Žydrūnas Savickas) competed head-to-head for the first time since the 2015 contest, but Eddie Hall won his first title over runner-up Hafþór Júlíus Björnsson by 1 point and was the first person to win for the UK since Welshman Gary Taylor in 1993. Hall also set a new strongman deadlift world record with a regular bar at  performed with just straps. 

Hafþór Júlíus Björnsson won the 2018 after three 3rd place and three 2nd place finishes and became the first Icelander since Magnús Ver Magnússon in 1996 to win the title. Mateusz Kieliszkowski of Poland finished second and four-time winner Brian Shaw of the United States third. Žydrūnas Savickas, also a four-time winner, finished tenth after withdrawing in event four due to an injury.

The 2019 contest was held in Bradenton, Florida. The contest was won by Martins Licis of the United States who defeated defending champion Hafþór Júlíus Björnsson of Iceland. Björnsson suffered an injury, plantar fasciitis, in the qualifying heats but was able to complete the competition and finish 3rd on the podium, with Kieliszkowski finishing as the runner up for the second consecutive year. This year also saw brothers Tom and Luke Stoltman both qualify for the final, becoming the first brothers to both reach the final in history. A new format which included only 25 instead of 30 competitors was used and the entire competition only ran for 4 days instead of the usual 5+. The final was reduced to 5 events and took only one day. The new format was designed to streamline the editing for a quicker television turnaround.

2020s

Due to the COVID-19 pandemic, the 2020 contest, initially planned to be held in May at Bradenton, was postponed to November instead. In place from May through July was a special series called "World's Strongest Man: Home Edition" on Snapchat Discover, where participating strongman athletes filmed themselves at home recreating strongman events in creative ways, and fans could vote for their favourites. The series was hosted by Eddie Hall. Rongo Keene was declared the winner, earning him a $10,000 prize.

The 2020 contest was to be held on Anna Maria Island from 11 to 15 November, with no physical spectators allowed due to the ongoing COVID-19 pandemic. Because of bad weather conditions brought about by Hurricane Eta, the first two days were instead pushed back a day, removing the rest day planned on 13 November. For the first time in WSM history, none of the podium finishers from the previous year (Mariusz Pudzianowski was originally a podium finisher in 2004 before failing a drugs test) would compete in the contest. (Both Licis and Kieliszkowski were injured, whereas Björnsson had retired to focus on his boxing match with Eddie Hall). The contest was won by Oleksii Novikov, who set a new partial deadlift record of 537.5 kg (1,185 lbs) during the finals. Tom Stoltman came in 2nd place winning 3 of 6 events, while Jean-François Caron came in 3rd.

The 2021 edition of the contest took place in Sacramento, California from 15 to 20 June. Defending champion Novikov failed to advance from his qualifying heat, after finishing 4th in a tightly fought group which saw just one point separating 1st and 4th position. Tom Stoltman would improve on his second place finish the year before to claim his first title after defeating four-time champion Brian Shaw head-to-head in the Atlas Stones, and became the first Scotsman to win the title. Shaw would finish second, his best placing since his 4th title in 2016, and his first podium finish since 2018, while Canada's Maxime Boudreault would place third in his first WSM final.

The 2022 contest was shaping up to be one of the best contests yet, with 2019 champion Martins Licis returning, and 4 former champions in the competition. Unfortunately, Mateusz Kieliszkowski was once again forced to withdraw due to injury. Tom Stoltman successfully defended his title, winning by 10.5 points over Licis (in 2nd) and Oleksii Novikov, who placed 3rd despite winning 3 of the 6 events in the final. 

For a complete timeline, see the official WSM site:

Competition format and commonly contested events 
Initially, eight men representing various sports and strength disciplines were invited to compete against each other in unique events designed to test each individual to the fullest extent. The earliest events were relatively crude, but new ideas were introduced over the years. Some events had a basis in both powerlifting and Highland Games heavy events, and others were created based on mythological feats of strength. There are a number of events that make up each competition.

When the stones were first introduced to the competition, it was an individual event and the platforms were all of equal height. There are three current variations to the Atlas Stones event. In one, the stones are placed directly in front of the platforms and the competitors must simply lift and place them, generally the lightest stone being placed on the highest platform. In another, the stones are placed in a diagonal line, with the first stone being in front of the first platform, and each subsequent stone is set farther back from the course, with the heaviest stone being farthest away (or vice versa). The third variation sees the five platforms in a straight vertical line with the stones in front of each, and the competitors must place the stones and then move a short distance to the next one. In recent competitions, this is typically the final event. In the 2015 competition, the heaviest stone was 209 kilos (461 lbs).
 Vehicle pull – Vehicles such as transport trucks, trams, boxcars, buses, or planes are pulled across a  course as fast as possible. One variation sees the competitors pull the object with a rope toward them. Another has them attached to a rope which is attached to a vehicle, while they use another rope to pull themselves down the course. A third involves no ropes, with the competitors pulling the vehicle while connected to a harness. The 2007 competition featured pulling a fire truck (possibly a nod to 2006 champion Phil Pfister, a professional firefighter) and the 2008 qualifying rounds featured a coal truck (a reference to the coal mining industry in West Virginia, where the competition was held).
 Overhead Press – The heaviest possible load is pressed overhead, or a lighter weight is used for repetitions.
 Fingal's Fingers – A series of hinged poles ("fingers") are lifted starting from a horizontal resting position and flipped over to the other side. The poles get progressively heavier and longer. The event is scored by time and by how many of the poles a competitor was able to flip over. The event takes its name from Fingal, a mythological Gaelic hunter-warrior.
Recently, an apparatus has been used that drops weighted kegs into a cage, one at a time after each successful lift (the event, in this case, is scored by weight instead of repetitions). The athlete will continue until completion, failure or time expires.
 Dead Lift – Lifting weights or vehicles up to about  straight off the ground until knees lock in a standing position. Lift is for either maximum weight, maximum repetitions with a fixed weight, or for time whilst holding a single repetition. In recent years, a similar keg-loaded apparatus to that described above for the squat has been used.
A variation using kettlebells was added to the 2015 competition, while in 2017, gold bricks were used.
 Weight Throw – A  weight is thrown overhead with the goal being to clear a barrier above the competitor. The goal is to throw the weight the highest.
 Car Carry – Competitors stand inside a stripped-down automobile, which is missing some of its roof and all of its bottom and interior, and carry it across a  course. Competitors are scored by time, then distance once the time-limit expires.
 Hercules Hold – The athlete stands between two hinged pillars, gripping handles that prevent the pillars from falling to the side. The pillars are held for the longest possible time.
 Carry and Drag – An anchor and a chain are carried to the end of a set distance, where they must be attached to each other and then dragged back the same distance.
 Farmer's Walk – Competitors carry heavy objects (usually anvils) weighing from 275 to 375 lbs (125 to 170 kg) in each hand for a set distance, and compete for the fastest time. A variation involves the use of a heavy frame with parallel handles or heavy objects attached to handles, and another involves much heavier weights (referred to as the Giant Farmer's Walk). This event is usually done on the same course as the Carry and Drag and is conducted as a race, but one competition in Sanya, China saw the competitors compete individually carrying the weights up a small set of stairs. The 2001 competition saw the competitors race two at a time along a course requiring several turns.
 Super Yoke – Apparatus composed of a crossbar and two uprights. The uprights each have a heavy weight attached to them, such as a refrigerator or diesel engine, and the competitors must carry the yoke on their shoulders for a short distance.
 Husafell Stone – A flat, somewhat triangular lifting stone weighing around 410 lb (186 kg) is carried high on the chest for a set distance or for overall distance within a time limit. The stone is named for a famous one in Iceland, which actually was brought out for use when the competition was held in Iceland. During some years which the competition took place in Africa, this event was known as the Africa Stone and the stone was in the shape of the continent as it appears on a map. The 2017 competition called this event the Elephant Carry, and the stone was shaped like the head and face of an African elephant.
 Duck Walk – An object with a handle is carried, suspended between the legs, over a set course.
 Log Throw / Caber toss – A five-meter-long ( foot) log is thrown for distance or for height over a bar. When thrown for distance, the event is conducted similarly to the normal caber toss but with distance replacing technique. The length of the throw is determined by measuring the distance between where the competitor's toes were when he tossed and the tip of the log, based on where it first landed.
 Tug of War – One on one tug of war in a single-elimination tournament. In the first few competitions, this determined the champion and served as the final event.
 Pole Pushing – One on one pole pushing in a Sumo-style ring in a single-elimination tournament. The pole has handles at either end.
 Crucifix – Weights are held straight out at each side for as long a time as possible. A common variation entails weights being held out in front, using either one or both hands. 
 Giant Dumbbell Press – Single-handed dumbbells are hoisted from the ground onto the competitor's shoulder, from where, with one hand, he must raise it vertically over his head and lockout his arm.
 Basque Circle/Stone Circle/Conan's Wheel – A competitor takes hold of the handle of a metal basket by placing the handle on his forearms. Inside the basket, usually, is at least  of heavy stones (the 2015 WSM replaced the stones with pineapples and at least one earlier competition used a car). Holding the basket in the crook of his elbow, the competitor carries the basket in a clockwise manner over a platform with a  circumference. The event is contested for distance. 
Norse Hammers – Added to the competition for the first time in 2015, the Norse Hammers is similar to the Fingal's Fingers event. Three hammers, shaped like those of Norse god Thor, must be flipped over. Unlike the Fingal Fingers, the competitors must lift the hammer from the side before pushing it up. There are three hammers, weighing 350, 365, and 380 pounds, respectively. In order to complete the event, all three hammers must be flipped within the time limit.
Circus Barbell – Similar to the Overhead Press, this event gets its name from the apparatus used which resembles the classically shaped barbell used by circus strongmen. The barbell, which weighs , consists of two heavy spheres with a thick, flexible bar that makes it difficult for the competitors to lift. The event is conducted for reps within a time limit and the movement to complete the lift resembles a clean and press lift.

Beginning in 2017, the qualifying format was changed. After five events, the leader clinches a spot in the final while the last place competitor is eliminated from the competition. To determine the second finalist of the group, a new event called Last Man Standing was added. An Atlas Stone is placed at the center of an octagon and, one at a time, the competitors must lift the stone and drop it over a 55-inch metal bar. They each have twenty seconds to do this, and once one cannot complete the drop, he is eliminated and the next highest scoring competitor entering the event takes his turn. The competition continues in stepladder fashion, beginning with the fourth and fifth place competitors, until only one remains; that competitor is declared the winner of the event and secures the second place in the final for the qualifying group.

The 2018 competition used the Atlas Stones event to determine the second finalist. The three lowest scorers were eliminated from the competition, and the second and third place finishers squared off with the winner advancing to the final.

The 2019 competition saw the return of Last Man Standing, but instead of featuring the remaining four competitors, only the second and third place competitors square off to determine the second finalist.

Championship breakdown

Multiple time champions

Multiple Top 3 Finishes

Championships by country 

Australia, Bulgaria, Estonia, the Faroe Islands, Fiji, France, Georgia, Germany, Grenada, Hungary, Iran, Israel, Italy, Kenya, Namibia, New Zealand, Nigeria, Samoa, Serbia, and Slovenia as of 2019 have all placed in the Top 10 but have not yet won a medal.

Other 
Most times WSM top 5 placings: 13 –  Brian Shaw (2009–2018, 2020–2022)

Most WSM finals: 14 –  Brian Shaw (2009–2022)

Most times qualified for WSM: 17 –  Mark Felix (2004, 2006–2011, 2013–2022)

Most consecutive WSM Titles: 3 –  Bill Kazmaier (1980-1982) and  Magnús Ver Magnússon (1994–1996)

Most consecutive WSM podium finishes: 8 –  Hafþór Júlíus Björnsson (2012–2019)

Most consecutive WSM finals: 14 –  Brian Shaw (2009–2022)

Most consecutive WSM appearances: 15 –  Brian Shaw (2008–2022)

Most WSM runner-up finishes: 6 –  Žydrūnas Savickas (2002–2004, 2011, 2013, 2015)

Most WSM 3rd place finishes: 4 –  Brian Shaw (2009, 2014, 2017, 2018) and  Hafþór Júlíus Björnsson (2012, 2013, 2015, 2019)

Longest Time Between First and Last Championships: 6 years –  Jón Páll Sigmarsson (1984–1990) and  Mariusz Pudzianowski (2002–2008)

Longest Time Between First and Last Top 3 Finishes: 13 years –  Žydrūnas Savickas (2002–2015)

Longest Time Between First and Last Qualifications For Final: 16 years –  Žydrūnas Savickas (2002–2018)

Longest Time Between First and Last Qualifications: 20 years –  Žydrūnas Savickas (1998–2018)

Longest Gap Between Championships: 3 years –  Magnús Ver Magnússon (1991–1994)

Longest Gap Between Top 3 Finishes: 6 years –  Bill Kazmaier (1982–1988)

Longest Gap Between Appearances: 10 years –  Travis Ortmayer (2011–2021)

Hall of Fame 
The WSM Hall of Fame was created in 2008 to recognize the greatest competitors in the history of the contest. As of 2022, there are six members of the WSM Hall of Fame; Svend Karlsen, Bill Kazmaier, Mariusz Pudzianowski, Magnús Ver Magnússon, Magnus Samuelsson and Jón Páll Sigmarsson.

See also 
 List of strongman competitions
 List of strongmen

References

External links 

 
Strongmen competitions
CBS Sports Spectacular